Siou is a town in the Oury Department of Balé Province in southern Burkina Faso. The town has a total population of 2,531.

References

External links

Populated places in the Boucle du Mouhoun Region
Balé Province